Santo Domenico Versace (born 16 December 1944) is an Italian businessman and politician who is the president and co-chief executive officer of Gianni Versace SpA, based in Milan, Italy. Since 2008 he has been elected as Member of the Chamber of Deputies of the Italian Republic in the constituency of Calabria. He is a member of the Alliance for Italy political party, formerly being a member of The People of Freedom.

Biography

Early life

He was born on 16 December 1944 in Reggio Calabria, where he grew up with his younger siblings Gianni and Donatella, along with their father, Antonio, and dressmaker mother, Francesca. An older sister, Tina, died at the age of twelve from an improperly treated tetanus infection. By age six, Versace joined his father and continued to work after school and summers with him until he attended university.  When not in school, he helped care for his younger sister, Donatella. Like his brother Gianni, he attended Reggio Calabria's Liceo Classico Tommaso Campanella, where he studied Latin and Ancient Greek.

Personal life
In 1981, Versace married Christiana Cavalli. The couple had two children, Francesca Christiana and Antonio Tina Santo. The marriage ended in divorce in 2004. Versace remarried in 2014 to lawyer Francesca de Stefano, with whom he had one daughter, Ramona Francesca.

Career and professional life

In 1968, Santo graduated from the University of Messina with a degree in economics. He began working first as a banker in Reggio Calabria for Credito Italiano and later as a high school teacher of economics and geography.  In 1972, he completed his military service as an officer in the "Genova Cavalleria." Upon completion of his service, Santo opened his own accounting office in both Reggio Calabria and Milan.

In 1976, he moved permanently to Milan where he began working full-time with his brother. Gianni Versace SpA was founded in 1977, with Santo Versace as CEO until 2004. Santo played a leading role in the success of the Versace brand by focusing on communication, organization, productivity, and quality.  He oversaw all areas of the business—including sales, distribution, production and finance—and quickly became one of the industry's leading and most well-respected businesspeople.

In 1998, Santo was appointed president of the Italian Fashion Chamber where he served from 1998 to 1999.

Since 1998 he is a shareholder of Viola Reggio Calabria Basketball. From June 1998 to October 1999 was "President of the National Chamber of Italian Fashion." He is Chairman of Operation Smile Italy Onlus, an association of doctors and volunteers which deals with children with facial deformities in 70 countries around the world.

In 2019 he set up the Fondazione Santo Versace, a charity that supports humanitarian work both in Italy and abroad.

In popular culture
Versace is portrayed by Italian actor Giovanni Cirfiera in the second season of the anthology series American Crime Story, which premiered on 17 January 2018.

Notes and references

Notes

Citations

External links
 Versace official website

1944 births
Living people
People from Reggio Calabria
Italian businesspeople in fashion
Italian chief executives
Versace
The People of Freedom politicians
21st-century Italian politicians
Act to Stop the Decline politicians
Alliance for Italy politicians
People of Calabrian descent
University of Messina alumni